Dexter Seanancy Fahey (born 14 October 1989) is a South African professional rugby union player, currently playing with the . He can play as a loosehead or tighthead prop.

Career

Sharks Academy

After high school, Fahey joined the  Academy, where he played for the  team in the 2008 Under-19 Provincial Championship and for the  team in the 2010 Under-21 Provincial Championship.

NMMU / Eastern Province Kings

He was a regular for the side in four tournaments from 2011 to 2014, making 18 appearances.

In 2012, he was also called up by the Port Elizabeth-based provincial side . This turned out to be his only appearance for the Kings.

SWD Eagles

His home debut for the Eagles came in their match against the  two weeks later, followed by his first start in the next match against  in Wellington.

References

1989 births
Living people
Eastern Province Elephants players
Rugby union players from Durban
Rugby union props
South African rugby union players
SWD Eagles players